The Saugeen Valley Conservation Authority (SVCA) is a conservation authority in Ontario, Canada. It operates under the Conservation Authorities Act of Ontario. It is a corporate body, through which municipalities, landowners and other organizations work cooperatively to manage the Saugeen River watershed and natural resources within it.

Created in 1950, the SVCA has jurisdiction over 4,675 km2. (1,800 sq. miles) of land in southwestern Ontario, and owns over 8,498 ha (21,000 acres) of natural areas, including conservation areas and forests.

History 

The Saugeen Valley Conservation Authority was created with the intention of responding to problems of flooding on the river, and the effect it had on local communities.  One of the first projects of the authority was to build a dyke system around the town of Walkerton to address the problems of flooding in the town.

Over time, land was bought and added to the authority's jurisdiction.  Present-day conservation areas were sold or donated to the authority, such as Sulphur Spring Conservation Authority, south of Hanover, which was created in the 1920s by a private landowner, A.J. Metzger, and sold to the SVCA in 1969.
In 1973, the Saugeen Valley Conservation Foundation, a non-profit organization, was formed to raise funds for conservation projects in the SVCA.  There are 15 member municipalities: Arran-Elderslie, Brockton, Chatsworth, Grey Highlands, Hanover, Howick, Huron-Kinloss, Kincardine, Minto, Morris-Turnberry, Saugeen Shores, South Bruce, Southgate, Wellington North, and West Grey.

In 1996, the Ontario provincial Conservative government of the day cut the Authority's budget by 70%, limiting its ability to monitor water run-off quality. At the same time jobs were cut in the ministry responsible for assuring that water treatment facilities were kept in repair. .  In 2000, E.-coli in farm runoff leaked into the watershed, contributing to the Walkerton Tragedy.  Representatives of the Authority were called to testify at the subsequent inquiry. The budget cuts were among the events found to have led up to the seven deaths.  The inquiry led, among other things, to changes in legislation concerning all of the conservation authorities in Ontario.

Today, the authority has taken on additional responsibilities beyond flood management. It manages 15 conservation areas and five campgrounds, monitors wildlife, participates in research contributes data for environmental assessments and provides public education programs available to residents and visitors of conservation lands.

Canoe route 

The Saugeen River is a popular canoeing destination in southern Ontario.  The SVCA manages the canoe route, which begins at Hanover Park in the town of Hanover, and ends 102 kilometres downstream at Denny's Dam Conservation Area, near the town of Southampton.  The route is generally broad and placid, with few rapids, making the route an ideal beginner's course.

Three portages are maintained, which bypass dams on the river. The SVCA also maintains access points and parks along the canoe routes.

Conservation areas 

Allan Park Management Unit
Beaverdale Bog
Bells Lake Management Unit
Brucedale Conservation Area
Denny's Dam Conservation Area
Durham Conservation Area
Glammis Bog
Greenock Swamp Complex
Kinghurst Management Unit
McBeath Conservation Area
Moss Lake
Osprey Wetlands
Saugeen Bluffs Conservation Area
Stoney Island Conservation Area
Sulphur Spring Conservation Area

Camping facilities exist at Brucedale, Denny's Dam, Durham, McBeath, and Saugeen Bluffs Conservation Areas.

See also 

Saugeen River
Conservation Ontario
Conservation authority (Ontario, Canada)

References

External links 
Saugeen Valley Conservation Authority
 Conservation Authorities Act. R.R.O. 1990, REGULATION 106. CONSERVATION AREAS — GRAND RIVER. e-Laws. ServiceOntario. Government of Ontario.
Saugeen River Canoe Route Saugeen Valley Conservation Authority Canoe Route
Member Municipalities Saugeen Valley Conservation Authority.
http://www.ontla.on.ca/committee-proceedings/transcripts/files_html/2006-08-22_SP026.htm

1950 establishments in Ontario
1950 in the environment
Conservation areas in Ontario